Coral is a 1925 novel by the British writer Compton Mackenzie. It is a sequel to his 1912 work Carnival.

References

Bibliography
 David Joseph Dooley. Compton Mackenzie. Twayne Publishers, 1974.
 Andro Linklater. Compton Mackenzie: A Life Hogarth Press, 1992.

1925 British novels
Novels by Compton Mackenzie
British comedy novels